Edward Hughes Glidden (1873 – May 2, 1924) was a Baltimore-based architect of many residential apartment buildings and commercial structures including the Sydenham Hospital and the Furness-Withy Building.

Glidden's father was  "William Pierce Glidden, founder of the Glidden Varnish Company. Against his father's wishes, he became an architect, studying in Paris from 1908 to 1912. He eventually made his way to Baltimore and established an office there. Chief among his works in Baltimore were the Homewood Apartments, Washington, Canterbury Hall and Tudor Hall Apartments."

References 

19th-century American architects
1873 births
1924 deaths
20th-century American architects